Helwer is a surname. Notable people with the surname include:

Ed Helwer (born 1940), Canadian politician
Reg Helwer, Canadian politician

See also 

 Helwerthia

German-language surnames
Surnames of German origin
Surnames of Russian origin